Only Inhuman is the second studio album by Swedish melodic death metal band Sonic Syndicate. Released May 18, 2007 in Europe and on May 22, 2007, in North America. It's also the first album the band released through their new label, Nuclear Blast, as well as the first to feature vocalist Roland Johansson and drummer John Bengtsson as full-time members.

The album was produced by Jonas Kjellgren, one of the guitar players of the Swedish melodic death metal band Scar Symmetry. A limited edition of the album features a bonus track, entitled "Freelancer", while the Japanese edition contains "My Soul In #000000". The album ranked number 22 on the Swedish charts after one week of sales.

Only Inhuman was re-released in North America on May 6, 2008.  The re-release, dubbed "Only Inhuman Tour Edition" includes a bonus DVD containing the videos for the songs "Denied" and "Enclave" as well as a photography section and a live performance of the band, filmed in Cologne, Germany on June 21, 2007.

Only Inhuman is sometimes considered the band's true debut album since Eden Fire consisted mostly of remade songs which were originally released when the band was still called Fallen Angels.

Track listing

Bonus tracks

Tour edition
The tour edition features the original Only Inhuman album (with Limited Edit bonus track "Freelancer") and a DVD with live performance of the band in Cologne, Germany(from. WDR Rockpalast). There was also a reissue of the Tour Edition which had different artwork but did not include the live DVD. The live-DVD can also rarely be bought separate from the album. The separated DVD version has the same cover as the Tour Edition, only retitled to Live Inhuman (which is the original name of the tour-DVD). The "Live Inhuman" version is a rare Nuclear Blast exclusive release.

Chart positions

Personnel
Sonic Syndicate
Richard Sjunnesson – harsh vocals
Roland Johansson – vocals
Roger Sjunnesson – guitars & electronics
Robin Sjunnesson – guitars
Karin Axelsson – bass guitar
John Bengtsson – drums & percussion

Production
Jonas Kjellgren – producer/mixer/master/engineer
 Christian Silver – co-producer (drums only)
 Torsten Bürgin – artwork
 Sabine Hauptmann – artwork
 Solile Siirtola – photography
 Patric Ullaeus – director (Denied and Enclave)

References

2007 albums
Sonic Syndicate albums
Nuclear Blast albums